County College of Morris (CCM) is a public community college in Randolph, New Jersey. CCM offers associate degree and certificate programs as well as transfer opportunities for students looking to pursue a bachelor's degree at another institution.

History 
The college was founded in 1966 and first opened its doors to students in 1968. The college's first president was Dr. Sherman H. Masten. The college's library was later renamed in his honor, becoming the Sherman H. Masten Learning Resource Center.

When President Masten retired in 1986, Dr. Edward J. Yaw became the second president of CCM. After 30 years of leadership as CCM president, Dr. Yaw retired in 2016 and Dr. Anthony J. Iacono became the college's third president. Prior to joining CCM, President Iacono had served as vice president of Academic Affairs at Indian River State College in Fort Pierce, FL.

Campus 
The college is located in Randolph, Morris County, New Jersey.

Infrastructure 
In the Summer of 2012, the Morris County Improvement Authority installed solar parking canopies across five parking lots at CCM., and upgraded exterior lighting to LED fixtures. Trees cut down to accommodate the solar installation were replaced with ornamental trees and bushes in the Spring of 2013.

Buildings 
Cohen, DeMare, Emeriti and Sheffield halls comprise the main academic center of the campus. Other major college facilities include the LEED certified Landscape and Horticultural Technology building and greenhouses, the Music Technology Center, named in honor of Dr. Edward J. Yaw, the college's second president; the Student Community Center; Learning Resource Center; and the Health and Physical Education building. Henderson Hall, which was the college's first building, serves as the main administrative building.

Longo Planetarium 
The Madeline D. and Joseph J. Longo Planetarium is a 91-seat dome theater that features a Digistar 4 SP2 HD Digital Projector, which serves astronomy classes on campus and offers public showings for education and entertainment.

Dragonetti Auditorium 
The Dragonetti Auditorium is a 500-seat performing arts venue.

Transportation 
Parking is available free to both students and alumni at any of the student parking lots (parking decal required). Public transportation to the campus is available weekdays via New Jersey Transit local bus route 875, which stops in front of the student center. The bus provides access to the Dover Train Station, where transfers are available to bus routes 872 and 880.

Academic profile 
CCM is accredited by the Commission on Higher Education of the Middle States Association of Colleges and Schools, and has one of the highest graduation rates among the 19 county colleges in the state of New Jersey.

Beginning Fall 2014, Rutgers University will offer baccalaureate degrees courses on the CCM campus in psychology, journalism, criminal justice, and public and non-profit administration.

In addition to its adult services, CCM also has a summer camp program for middle and high school students. The summer program includes courses in English, astronomy, math, science, and history.

Student life 
The student body consists of more than 8,500 undergraduate students. There are more than 40 student clubs on campus.

The County College of Morris is smoke-free and one of the first public colleges to ban smoking entirely. The decision to ban smoking was a project of the 2005-2006 Student Government Association.

Athletics 
CCM is a NJCAA Division II school. Its athletic conference is the Garden State Athletic Conference.

Men's: Baseball, Basketball, Golf, Soccer, 
Women's: Basketball, Soccer, Softball, Volleyball

Notable alumni and faculty 

 Alex Cable, optical engineer, inventor and entrepreneur, founder of Thorlabs.
 Jennifer Jones (born 1967), first African-American Rockette.
 Christopher McCulloch (born 1971), creator, director, and co-writer (with Doc Hammer) of the Adult Swim cartoon The Venture Bros, under the pseudonym Jackson Publick.
 Joe McEwing (born 1972), baseball player played for the New York Mets.
 Adam Riggs (born 1972), former Los Angeles Angels player known for his misspelled "Angees" jersey in a 2003 game.

See also 

New Jersey County Colleges
Rutgers University
Youngtown Edition

References

External links
Official website
Rutgers University at County College of Morris

 
Educational institutions established in 1968
Garden State Athletic Conference
New Jersey County Colleges
Randolph, New Jersey
Universities and colleges in Morris County, New Jersey
NJCAA athletics